Ando Drom are a Roma (i.e. "Gypsy") music ensemble from Hungary, founded in 1984. "Ando drom" means "on the road" in the Romany language.

They have devoted themselves to the preservation and continued evolution of the traditional music of their culture. Their musical director is multi-instrumentalist and vocalist Jeno Zsigó and Mónika Juhász Miczura ("Mitsou") has sung with them for many years. They have also featured guest musicians from the French group Bratsch and the cimbalom virtuoso Kálmán Balogh. They were twice winners of the Hungarian Nivo prize.

External links 
 Official website
 A short biography - by Craig Harris, in Allmusic
 A longer biography - from World Music Central

Hungarian Romani musical groups
Hungarian folk music groups

Romani-language bands